Fredrik Wilhelm Scholander (June 23, 1816 – May 9, 1881) was a Swedish architect and artist.

Biography

Fredrik Wilhelm Scholander was born in Stockholm, Sweden. He was the son of Georg Fredrik Scholander  (1785-1825) and Karin Nyström (1786
-1866). His mother was the sister of architect Per Axel Nyström (1793–1868). He became fatherless at the age of nine, and his uncle then became his foster father.
Scholander studied art in 1831 at the Royal Swedish Academy of Arts. 
He settled in Paris during 1841, where for almost two years he was a student of Louis-Hippolyte Lebas (1782–1867) at École des Beaux-Arts.

He was called in 1847 as vice-professor and  became a full professor of architecture at the Royal Swedish Academy of Arts in 1848.
He trained many members of the next generation of Swedish architects, among them Helgo Zettervall (1831–1907) and Isak Gustaf Clason (1856–1930). From 1851-53 he was a director and between 1851-66 he served as treasurer. In 1868, he became the academy's secretary and held this position until his death.

Among his main works are the Stockholm Synagogue, the Katedralskolan school building in Uppsala, the County Museum in Växjö, Stadshotellet in Mariestad, the old Royal Institute of Technology building on Drottninggatan in Stockholm, the Bernadotte royal burial chapel at Riddarholmskyrkan, as well as several interiors at Drottningholm Palace and the Stockholm Palace.

Personal life
Scholander was married to his cousin Carin Nyström (1830–1912). They had seven children; among them musician and composer Sven Scholander (1860–1936) and artist Anna Boberg (1864 –1935). Scholander died in 1881 and was buried at Norra Begravningsplatsen in Solna.

Gallery

References

Swedish male painters
1816 births
1881 deaths
Artists from Stockholm
École des Beaux-Arts alumni
19th-century Swedish painters
19th-century Swedish architects
Burials at Norra begravningsplatsen
19th-century Swedish male artists